Francine Descarries (born 1942) is a Canadian sociologist. She is a professor of sociology at the Université du Québec à Montréal. She is considered a leading figure in feminist studies in Quebec.

Biography 
At the age of 16, after the death of her father, Descarries left school so that her family could afford her brother's medical training. Descarries found work as a legal secretary then as a travel agent, then left the workforce to care for her children. She returned to school at age 27, shortly after the birth of her second child. She attended Cégep Édouard-Montpetit. With a scholarly interest in women's issues and feminism, Descarries went on to earn undergraduate, master's, and doctoral degrees in sociology from the Université de Montréal.

In 1980, Descarries published L'École rose… et les cols roses (The pink school... and the pink collar), based on her master's research. The book addressed the sexual division of labour and social reproduction in workplaces and schools in Quebec.

In 1985, she joined the faculty at the Université du Québec à Montréal (UQAM). In 1990, she became a founding member of the Institute of Feminist Research and Studies at UQAM. Descarries served as the scientific committee director for the 7th , held in Montreal in 2015.

Descarries's scholarly interests include feminist theory, the evolution of the women's movement in Quebec, family, and women in the workforce.

Awards and honours 

 2012: Ursula Franklin Award in Gender Studies, Royal Society of Canada
 2019: Prix Marie-Andrée-Bertrand, Prix du Québec, Government of Québec

Selected works

Books

Article

References 

Living people
1942 births
Université de Montréal alumni
Academic staff of the Université du Québec à Montréal
Canadian women academics
Canadian academics of women's studies
Canadian women social scientists
Canadian sociologists
French Quebecers
Canadian women sociologists